Bořetice is the name of several locations in the Czech Republic:

 Bořetice (Břeclav District), a village in the South Moravian Region
 Bořetice (Pelhřimov District), a village in the Vysočina Region